Students Solidarity March is a rally in support of demands of students taking place in Pakistan since 2018. First, on November 30, 2018 in ten cities of Pakistan, students rallies were held. In Islamabad, it was organised by Progressive Students Federation along with other students organizations. Second time it took place on November 29, 2019 in 53 cities of Pakistan. This march was supported by Students Action Committee which was joined by many progressive organizations. The main demands were to increase in education budget, restoration and elections of student unions and democratic rights for students. Participants also strongly condemned occupation of their hostels by paramilitary forces and poor investigation of sexual harassment cases. On 19 November 2020, a student namely adv. Fida Hussain Wazir from South Waziristan district submitted an application in the Supreme Court of Pakistan for reconsideration of its 1992 judgement. He has requested for reconsideration of ban on students Politics and student unions.

Background 
Pakistan has vibrant history of student politics, Students were actively participating in students' union elections and played important role in looking after interests of students. In 1984, student unions were banned by the Ziaul Haq dictatorship.  1968 movement in Pakistan which later toppled Ayub Khan was initiated through student protest.

According to Iqbal Haider Butt’s book, Revisiting Student Politics in Pakistan, In 1983's student union elections in [[Karachi]] all progressive and anti-dictatorship alliances swept the polls and then Sindh’s provincial Governor Lieutenant-General SM Abbasi warned Zia Ul Haq that due to student union, universities and colleges can once again become breeding grounds of anti-government agitation. After him students politics was allowed in country for a short time till they were again banned by Supreme Court of Pakistan in 1993. Judgement had banned politics within campus but had stressed for a platform where students may indulge in intellectual discussions and debates. Many student organisations started to slowly decline but right-wing organization like  Islami Jamiat-e-Talba (IJT) and Muslim Students Federation continued to operate in few universities and somewhat district level

On commenting current situation of Students, famous left wing writer Lal Khan wrote, "Students in private and public educational institutions are facing harsh and oppressive administrations, expulsions, frequent penalties and fines, a suffocating environment, conservative curriculum and a very low standard of education. The ethos students are being taught are selfishness, competition and careerism. How can they become healthy members of society? Decline in culture, crimes, drugs, lumpenisation and alienation is an expression of this. Let us not forget that it was during Zia’s rule that the ‘Kalashnikov culture’ and sectarian tensions were implanted in student politics". Government of Pakistan is cutting funding for schools and universities and there is substantial increase in education expenses. Sexual harassment is on rise, students are being subjected to unnecessary "policing" by law enforcement agencies and students voice is being crushed. On campus Cases like Lynching of Mashal Khan, rape and murder of medical student Nimrita Kumari. and murder of several students at campus depicts harsh realities.One of March organizer put reason of march is following words;<blockquote>We are marching on November 29 to organise and to seek institutional power in universities and create a way of holding onto that power. It’s our education — we should control it. </blockquote>

 Students Solidarity March 2018 
Student Solidarity march 2018 held successfully in more than 50 cities of Pakistan which was joined by thousands of Students, academics, politicians, activists and civil society supporters. Many notable personalities like Iqbal Lala (father of the late Mashal Khan), Ammar Rashid, Bushra Gohar, Ali Usman Qasmi, Jalila Haider, Nida Kirmani, Jibran Nasir, Farooq Tariq, Lal Khan and other also joined and expressed their solidarity with students. The Charter of Demands presented by students in march included restoring student unions, student representation in decision-making on campuses, functional sexual harassment policies on campuses, freezing the fee hikes, increasing the budgetary allowing for education to 5% of GDP and improving the quality of research and teaching.

Students Solidarity March 2019

The Students' Solidarity March 2019 insists that the government must ensure the following: Lift the ban and hold elections for student unions
 Abandon privatisation of educational institutes, and reverse a recent decision of school and college fee hike
 The state should pledge free education for all
 No more budget cuts for the Higher Education Commission, or sacking of educational staff
 At least five per cent of the GDP should be allocated for education
 Abolish the semester system
 Lift a ban on students from participating in political activities
 End the intervention (in the name of national security) of security forces in educational institutions, and release all students held captive
 Establish committees to investigate incidents of sexual harassment, and ensure women are made a part of the set up
 All universities should have a library, hostel and provide transport and an internet connection
 Modernise education systems according to the modern scientific requirements
 Set up schools and colleges in lesser developed areas, and increase the quota of students coming from outside main cities
 Establish research centres for a transition from fossil fuel energy to renewable energy in public sector universities
 Announce April 13 as a national holiday to honour Mashal Khan
Pakistan International Students Alliance, Laila Tauqeer, President of the Harvard College Pakistani Students Association, Hamza Tariq Chaudhry, President of the Pakistan Development Society at the London School of Economics and other also expressed solidarity and wrote open letter to Government of Pakistan urging to fulfill demands of students. 

Aftermath
Successful Student Solidarity March sparked a debate on students movement, slogan of March “Surkh hoga, surkh hoga – Asia surkh hoga''! (It will turn red, it will turn red – Asia will turn red) boomed students of all country. Sindh province announced to lift the ban on student unions in the province.  Lahore police registered cases against the organizers and participants including Ammar Ali Jan, Farooq Tariq, Iqbal Lala, Alamgir Wazir (nephew of MNA and Pashtun Tahaffuz Movement leader Ali Wazir), Mohammad Shabbir and Kamil Khan.

Students Solidarity March 2020
On 27th of November, despite fears of COVID-19, students from different cities of Pakistan marched for their rights. It was done with proper SOPS and masks were distributed among attendees. Demands of students varied from decrease of fee to the improvement of online education system during COVID-19, that was one of the focuses this year. Lifting ban on Student Union, as always, was the main focal point of the march. Along with that PMC illegally trying to conduct Mdcat was another prospect that drove students to the streets. PMC 2020 can surely be considered as one of the worst things that ever happened to medical education in the history of Pakistan. The mental torture endured by students was enough to drive them to protest, online on Twitter for days and on streets too.

Following the march, a member of Haqooq e Khalq movement and a strong Student March supporter, Ammar Ali Jan was declared a "threat to public safety" by DC Lahore and detained by Lahore police. He challenged it in Lahore High Court and a hearing followed a few days later. He also claimed that he had been receiving calls from unknown numbers that threatened him to not go on with his student centered  agenda.

In Islamabad, students action committee (SAC Islamabad-Rawalpindi) organized "Students Union Restoration March" on November 27, 2020.

Students Solidarity March 2021
Student Solidarity March, 2021 was held on November 26, 2021 across different cities in Pakistan.

See also 
Progressive Students Federation
Progressive Students Collective

References 

Student protests in Pakistan